A list of films produced by the Israeli film industry in 1974.

1974 releases

See also
1974 in Israel

References

External links
 Israeli films of 1974 at the Internet Movie Database

Israeli
Film
1974